Lavoriškės is a village in Vilnius district municipality, Lithuania, it is located only about  east of Vilnius city municipality. According to the 2011 census, it had population of 621.

References

Villages in Vilnius County
Vilnius District Municipality